Grand Slam of Golf may refer to:

Grand Slam (golf), the accomplishment of winning all of golf's major championships in the same calendar year
PGA Grand Slam of Golf, an annual four man tournament for the winners of the major golf championships for men